Cognia Cloud was a cloud-based compliance archiving and analytics company. It was established in 2007 to provide recording and regulatory solutions to financial institutions, telecommunications providers and field services enterprises. It was headquartered in the UK with operations in North America and Asia-Pacific.  In 2017, it was acquired by Smarsh.

Products and services 
Its core product offering was the Cognia unified communications archive, which monitors, stores and analyzes multi-channel business interactions across multiple media: mobile voice, text, landline, video, Skype, email and social media. 

Cognia worked with telco partners in North America, Asia and Europe and served over 60 banks and financial institutions meet regulatory requirements, including US Dodd-Frank and EU MiFID II. Cognia's major customers included Swisscom, Vodafone, BNP Paribas, Santander, Royal Bank of Scotland, AVIVA and Centrica.

References 

Companies based in the City of London
Regulation in the United Kingdom